The Victoria–Courtenay train (named the Malahat until 2009) was a passenger train service operated by Via Rail between Victoria, Nanaimo, and Courtenay on Vancouver Island in British Columbia. The service operated over the Island Rail Corridor. In March 2011, was suspended indefinitely due to poor track conditions along the line.

History

Via Rail Canada
The train was formerly operated with Budd Rail Diesel Cars. Via Rail took over passenger services from Canadian National, renaming the service the Malahat in 1979. The tracks were given minor maintenance due to low ridership, leading to service suspension.

Service suspension

Due to poor track conditions, on March 19, 2011, the service was suspended indefinitely for track replacement work. Prior to further inspection of the track, service along the segment between Nanaimo and Victoria was originally planned to resume on April 8, but lack of funding prevented any of the work from taking place. A temporary bus replacement was brought in for the service after the closure, but dropping passenger numbers caused the service to be discontinued on August 7. On May 10, nearly two months after suspension, the old Budd cars were moved from the roundhouse in Victoria to a secure yard in Nanaimo, in future hopes of starting commuter service from there. On November 5, they were taken off the island to be returned to central Canada and were to be replaced by new train stock if service resumed. In February 2012, the very short stretch of track from Harbour Road to downtown Victoria was taken out of service due to the removal of the railway bridge as the start of the Johnson Street Bridge replacement project. The Johnson Street Bridge now sit upon the location of the railway bridge. Currently, there are no plans to replace the railway bridge.

In July 2014, following the successful securing of funds from the local, federal, and provincial governments to replace trackage and repair bridges along the line, Via Rail reached an agreement with the Island Corridor Foundation to resume island passenger rail operations. Service between Victoria and Nanaimo was expected to resume in May 2015, with service between Nanaimo and Courtenay beginning in summer 2015. As of June 2018 repairs to the track have not commenced.

Route
When Via Rail took over the service from Canadian Pacific Railway, the line served only Victoria, Duncan, Nanaimo and Parksville daily except Sundays. In 1979, many intermediate stops that existed until the line's closure were added to the schedule and the train began operating daily. The train operated one daily round trip, departing Victoria in the morning, and returning from Courtenay in the evening. The  trip took 4 hours and 45 minutes each way. Proposals of operating a commuter service as far as Nanaimo, or Cowichan have now shifted to focus on running a Westshore commuter service along the first 15 kilometres of track between Victoria and Langford.

See also 
 Alberni Pacific Railway

References

External links 

Via Rail Canada – The Victoria–Courtenay train
Via Rail Canada – Victoria to Courtenay schedule

Passenger rail transport in British Columbia
Former Via Rail routes
Transport on Vancouver Island